La Pointe Courte  is a 1955 French drama film directed by Agnès Varda (in her feature film directorial debut). It has been cited by many critics as a forerunner of the French New Wave, with the historian Georges Sadoul calling it "truly the first film of the nouvelle vague". The film takes place in Sète in the south of France. The Pointe Courte ("short point") is a tiny quarter of the town known as the fisherman's village.

Plot
A young woman arrives on the Paris train at the port of Sète, where she is met by her husband who grew up there. Not sure whether she wants to continue their marriage, she has come to talk it through. As the couple wander around the fishermen's quarter, the film shows the life of its inhabitants. The women look after their homes and their children, one of whom falls ill and dies. The men in small boats follow their ancient trade, perturbed by pollution of the lagoon where they catch shellfish. The authorities try to stop use of the lagoon, with one young fisherman being arrested and jailed.

He is let out, however, for the annual regatta, at which the whole town turns out to cheer the jousts. Boats row past each other and, from a platform at the prow, a man with a lance tries to tip his opponent into the sea. The jailed man does so well that the father of his sweetheart gives him permission to woo her. Through the happy crowds dancing in the street, the Parisian couple walk to the railway station, having decided to continue their life together.

Cast 
 Philippe Noiret as Lui
 Silvia Monfort as Elle
 Marcel Jouet 
 Albert Lubrano
 Anna Banegas
 André Lubrano
 Rossette Lubrano

Production
Varda originally visited La Pointe Courte to take pictures for a friend who could no longer visit her home. After seeing the footage she took there, she rented a camera to shoot a film about a couple from Paris who were visiting La Pointe Courte, the husband's home town. Varda set up her own co-op and began production. The budget for the film was $14,000; roughly one quarter the budget of other feature films of the era including The 400 Blows and Breathless. No members of the cast or crew were paid during the production. Varda left the artistic direction of the film in the hands of her friend and artist Valentine Schlegel.

Themes
In a 1962 interview, Varda spoke of two present themes in the film with "the first being a couple reconsidering their relationship and a village that is trying to resolve several collective problems of survival". In her movie Les plages d'Agnès (The Beaches of Agnès), Varda says her film was inspired by William Faulkner's The Wild Palms.

In the magazine Cineaste, movie journalist Jonathan Kirshner pointed out themes in La Pointe Courte that Varda would revisit in later films, namely "a blend of documentary and fiction, detailed attentiveness to the economic conditions of the working class, subtle observations about the gender dynamics of social and familial relations, and, of course, the notable presence of cats."

Release
The film was first screened at the Cannes Film Festival in May 1955. Its premiere in Paris was in 1956 at the Studio Parnasse. It played with Jean Vigo's documentary film À propos de Nice (1930). The Criterion Collection has released the film in a four-DVD Region 1 box-set.

References

External links
 
 
 

1955 films
French drama films
1950s French-language films
1955 drama films
Films directed by Agnès Varda
French black-and-white films
1955 directorial debut films
1950s French films